Atys naucum, common names the "white nut sheath bubble'" and the "Pacific nut sheath bubble", is a species of small tropical sea snail, a bubble snail, a marine opisthobranch gastropod mollusk in the family Haminoeidae, the haminoea bubble snails.

Distribution
The distribution of this species occurs in the Indo-Pacific, off Madagascar,  the Red Sea, and also in Australia. It is a common species.

Description
The length of the shell of this species is 22–50 mm. In life the shell is light brown and inflated. When the animal dies the periostracum which covers the shell dries out and is lost. Juveniles have brown wavy lines on the shell. This snail is a herbivore.

References

 Dautzenberg, Ph. (1929). Contribution à l'étude de la faune de Madagascar: Mollusca marina testacea. Faune des colonies françaises, III(fasc. 4). Société d'Editions géographiques, maritimes et coloniales: Paris. 321–636, plates IV-VII pp.
 Rosenberg, G. 1992. Encyclopedia of Seashells. Dorset: New York. 224 pp. page(s): 117
 Sea Slug Forum info showing live animals
 NudiPixel image of live animal

Haminoeidae
Gastropods described in 1758
Taxa named by Carl Linnaeus